Santy Ngom (born 7 March 1993) is a professional footballer who plays as a forward for  club Villefranche. Born in France, he represents the Senegal national team.

Club career
Ngom is a youth product of Le Mans. In December 2015, he joined Bulgarian club Levski Sofia, where he would go on to make zero league appearances. He then transferred to La Suze FC in the Championnat de France Amateur 2, and after a successful season, moved to the reserve side of Nantes. Ngom made his professional debut for Nantes in a 2–1 Ligue 1 win over Toulouse on 4 November 2017.

In January 2019, Ngom joined Nancy on loan. In August 2019, he signed for Caen on a three-year contract. He left the club in April 2021 after having made a total of three Ligue 2 appearances.

In January 2022, Ngom joined Championnat National side Sète. Seven months later, he signed for Villefranche.

International career
Ngom was born in France, and is of Senegalese and Algerian descent. He made his international debut for the Senegal national team in a friendly 1–1 tie with Uzbekistan on 23 March 2018.

References

External links
 
 
 

1993 births
Living people
Footballers from Le Mans
Senegalese footballers
French footballers
Senegal international footballers
Senegalese people of Algerian descent
French sportspeople of Senegalese descent
French sportspeople of Algerian descent
Association football forwards
Le Mans FC players
En Avant Guingamp players
Paris Saint-Germain F.C. players
PFC Levski Sofia players
FC Nantes players
AS Nancy Lorraine players
Stade Malherbe Caen players
FC Sète 34 players
FC Villefranche Beaujolais players
Championnat National 2 players
Championnat National 3 players
Ligue 1 players
Ligue 2 players
Championnat National players
French expatriate footballers
Expatriate footballers in Bulgaria
French expatriate sportspeople in Bulgaria